Novo Selo is a village on the island of Brač in Croatia. It is administered as part of the municipality of Selca.

References

Brač
Populated places in Split-Dalmatia County